La Vansa i Fórnols is a municipality in the comarca of the Alt Urgell in Catalonia, Spain.

Villages:
Adraén
La Barceloneta
Colldarnat
Cornellana
Fórnols de Cadí
Montargull
Ossera
Padrinàs
Sant Pere
Sisquer
Sorribes de la Vansa

References

External links
 Government data pages 

Municipalities in Alt Urgell